Dynasty is a 1976 American Western television film directed by Lee Philips. It stars Harrison Ford, Sarah Miles and Stacy Keach. The film was made during the period before Star Wars in which Ford's career was gaining momentum after his roles in American Graffiti and The Conversation.

Cast
 Harrison Ford as Mark Blackwood
 Sarah Miles as Jennifer Blackwood
 Stacy Keach as Matt Blackwood
 Harris Yulin as John Blackwood
 Amy Irving as Amanda Blackwood
 Granville Van Dusen as Creed Vauclose
 Charles Weldon as Sam Adams
 Gerrit Graham as Carver Blackwood 
 Ian Wolfe as Dr. Klauber

References

External links
 

1976 television films
1976 Western (genre) films
Films scored by Gil Mellé
Films directed by Lee Philips
NBC network original films
American Western (genre) television films
1970s English-language films